In 2016, police discovered a child sex abuse network run from Berkhamsted in Hertfordshire, England. Eight of the men were convicted and some received significant prison sentences.

The discovery resulted in a police investigation in 2017 which helped to uncover many other child abusers worldwide.

Operation Pendent 

Operation Pendent was a child sex abuse investigation in 2017 into the Berkhamsted network; it was led by Hertfordshire Constabulary, and helped to uncover many other child abusers worldwide. One suspect in the United States was arrested within 48 hours of information being passed to Homeland Security.

Media restrictions 

For much of 2017, media reporting on the criminal proceedings members of the network was under reporting restrictions. Restrictions were lifted on 20 December 2017, when six offenders were sentenced. A seventh was jailed in February 2018.

Sentences

References

External links 
 Herts Constabulary awarded for Investigation of the Year

2010s crimes in the United Kingdom
British people convicted of child sexual abuse
Child sexual abuse in England
Rape in the 2010s
Rape in England
Rape trials
Sex crime trials
Sex crimes in England
Sex crimes in the United Kingdom
Sex gangs
2010s trials
2017 crimes in the United Kingdom
2017 in England
Crime in Hertfordshire
2010s in Hertfordshire
21st century in England
Child abuse incidents and cases
Scandals in England
Child pornography
Pedophilia